Penicillium gorlenkoanum is a species of the genus of Penicillium which produces citrinin, costaclavine and epicostaclavine.

References

Further reading

 
 

gorlenkoanum
Fungi described in 1968